Fall Creek Township may refer to:

Illinois
 Fall Creek Township, Adams County, Illinois

Indiana
 Fall Creek Township, Hamilton County, Indiana
 Fall Creek Township, Henry County, Indiana
 Fall Creek Township, Madison County, Indiana

Township name disambiguation pages